Alejandro Peña (born 20 October 1949) is a Mexican former footballer. He competed in the men's tournament at the 1972 Summer Olympics.

References

External links
 
 

1949 births
Living people
Mexican footballers
Mexico international footballers
Olympic footballers of Mexico
Footballers at the 1972 Summer Olympics
Footballers from Guadalajara, Jalisco
Association football forwards
Club Universidad Nacional footballers
Leones Negros UdeG footballers
Philadelphia Atoms players
Mexican expatriate footballers
Expatriate soccer players in the United States